Flight 663 may refer to the following aviation accidents:

Aeroflot Flight 663, crashed on 24 August 1963
Eastern Air Lines Flight 663, crashed on 8 February 1965
United Airlines Flight 663, suspected terrorist attack on 7 April 2010

0663